Triumph the Church and Kingdom of God in Christ is an African American Holiness-Pentecostal denomination founded in 1897 by Apostle "Father" Elias Dempsey Smith. Around 1936 there were two congregations and thirty-six members, by 1972 there were 425 congregations located in the United States, Africa, and the Philippines. As of 2011, there are congregations in 36 states within the USA and Liberia, West Africa.

References

Spiritual organizations
Pentecostal denominations
Christian denominations established in the 19th century
Christian denominations established in the 20th century
Historically African-American Christian denominations
Holiness denominations